Tantia University is located in Sri Ganganagar, Rajasthan, India.  It was established under the Tantia University, Sri Ganganagar Act, 2013. It was founded as part of a series of initiatives launched by Dr. Shyam Sunder Tantia, who was a visionary person and had attributes of simplicity and humbleness.

Academic Organisation 
The university has 14 faculties:

 Faculty of Ayurveda
 Faculty of Homeopathy
 Faculty of Nursing
 Faculty of Education
 Faculty of Physical Education
 Faculty of Law
 Faculty of Agriculture
 Faculty of Pharmacy
 Faculty of Veterinary Sciences
 Faculty of Engineering & Technology
 Faculty of Medical, Para-Medical and Allied Health Sciences
 Faculty of Arts, Craft and Social Sciences
 Faculty of Commerce and Management
 Faculty of Science

References

External links

Private universities in India
Universities in Rajasthan
Education in Sri Ganganagar district
2013 establishments in Rajasthan
Educational institutions established in 2013